Get Busy Living is a studio album by  Goldfish. Released on September 20, 2010 through Goldfish Music and Sony Music, in 2011 it won Best Global Dance Album at the 17th South African Music Awards.

Track listing

Awards and nominations

Personnel

 Goldfish - primary artist

References

External links
 GoldfishLive.com 
Get Busy Living at Discogs

2010 albums
Goldfish (band) albums